Lucio Guachalla (born 19 October 1949) is a Bolivian long-distance runner. He competed in the marathon at the 1976 Summer Olympics.

References

1949 births
Living people
Athletes (track and field) at the 1976 Summer Olympics
Bolivian male long-distance runners
Bolivian male marathon runners
Olympic athletes of Bolivia
Place of birth missing (living people)
South American Games silver medalists for Bolivia
South American Games bronze medalists for Bolivia
South American Games medalists in athletics
Competitors at the 1978 Southern Cross Games